Al-Hashemi-II is the largest dhow ever built, and is one of the largest wooden ships in the world today.  It sits next to the Radisson Blu Hotel in Kuwait City, Kuwait. It contains a maritime museum known as Al-Hashemi-II Marine Museum.

Development and design
Al-Hashemi-II was commissioned by Husain Marafie.  Planning began in 1985, and actual construction began in 1997.  The ship cost more than $30 million to build.

Used for meetings and events and advertised as the "largest dhow ever built", it is one of the world's largest wooden ships. It has never been floated, although it was built utilising traditional caulking and other water-tightness construction methods.

Guinness Record
It is entered in the Guinness Book of World Records as the largest wooden dhow ever built, appearing in the 2002 Guinness World Records under the caption "DHOW AMAZING!" and categorised as "Ships, largest Arabic dhow".

There are different metrics used to record ship lengths, which may account for that variance.

See also
 Fateh Al-Khayr

References

External links
Full view

Replica ships
2001 ships
Ships of Kuwait
Museum ships in Kuwait
Buildings and structures in Kuwait City
Museums in Kuwait
Cultural centers in Kuwait